BC Statyba was a Vilnius basketball club. The club was founded in 2011 as a successor to previous BC Statyba, which in 1997 was renamed to Lietuvos Rytas and currently considers itself to be a new club and not a continuation of Statyba. The club debuted in NKL during the 2011–12 season. However, after 2012–13
the club suspended its operations due to financial problems.

Results

References

BC Statyba
National Basketball League (Lithuania) teams
Sport in Vilnius
Basketball teams established in 2011
Basketball teams in Lithuania
2011 establishments in Lithuania
2013 disestablishments in Lithuania
Basketball teams disestablished in 2013